Beyond Comics is an American independent comic book publishing company founded by comics writer/artist Graig Weich, through which Weich has published comics featuring his creations, including Code Name: Justice, Ravedactyl, Justice, Gekido, and Gekido vs. Code Name: Justice..

History
Beyond Comics was launched by Graig Weich, who began reading comic books as a child, finding in them a sense of hope and inspiration when he was bullied as a child. "When my friends and I were bullied, I thought, 'If we were superheroes, we could defend the kids being attacked.'"

After the September 11 attacks, Weich spoke with some children who informed him that they did not feel there were any heroes that they could identify with. In response, Weich created the superhero Justice, a man who, following the death of his girlfriend at the World Trade Center, wears an American flag as a mask, and takes it upon himself to confront terrorists. Weich created the character to symbolize hope and empowerment for civilians. The first year's proceeds from the first book featuring the character, titled Civilian Justice, were donated to the Restaurant Opportunities Center of New York, and the families from Windows on the World (ROC NY) HERE Fund, which aided victims and families of non-union workers who lost their lives in the attacks. At the New York City Comic Book Museum's first annual Golden Panel Awards in October 2002, which honors creators who legitimize the comics medium, Beyond Comics and Weich were awarded the Golden Panel Award. An original Civilian Justice piece was also displayed in the exhibit "Heroes Among Us: The Art of 9-11".

Media appearances

Weich appeared in the August 24, 2011 series premiere of the FOX reality television appraisal series Buried Treasure, episode "A Comic Book, a Violin and a Hoarder". In the episode Leigh and Leslie Keno of Antiques Roadshow appraise valuable items for their owners.

Weich appeared in "Baby Got Super Powers", the December 2, 2012 episode of the E! network's reality TV series Ice Loves Coco, in which Beyond Comics cast model Coco Austin as a superheroine character in the comic book Gekido. Coco appeared as the scantily-clad super heroine at the 2012 New York Comic Con to promote the comic.

Weich drew radio producer Gary Dell'Abate as a ninja in the comic book Gekido, along with Coco.

According to Weich, the character Gekido (whose name means "rage" in Japanese) is a centuries-old man wearing modern-day samurai-like body armor on a mission to confront the world's oldest ninja clan to stop their plans for world domination, using a mystical artifact that may destroy the world. Other celebrities whom Beyond Comics has cast as characters in their comics include Donald Faison, Adrianne Curry, and Cary Hiroyuki Tagawa.

Awards
2002 Honorary Golden Panel Award (for Civilian Justice)
2014 Best Short Film Animation

Further reading
Myricks, Dan (June 11, 2014). "Going Big! Focus Entrepreneur of the Month: Graig Weich - Focus of New York Swim 2014"]. Focus Magazine, pp. 94–95.

References

External links 

Delaney, Magdaline (March 4, 2014). "EPN's Entrepreneur of the Month! Graig Weich". EPN.
Gambichler, Edward (June 27, 2013). "The Art of Graig Weich – at the Peter Louis Salon and Gallery". What'cha Reading?
Pineda, Juan Carlos  (May 10, 2013). "Comics and Beyond with Graig Weich!" . What'cha Reading? 
Gurian, Jeffrey (October 20, 2012). "Adrianne Curry from America's Next Top Model at Comic Con". YouTube. 
Angelo, Demetrius (December 6, 2014). "2014 UASE Cinemax VIP Welcome Reception at HBO". Urban Action Expo Film Festival. At: 8:10 mark.
"Baby Got Super Powers" Promo". Ice Loves Coco, YouTube, December 2, 2012.

 
Comic book publishing companies of the United States
Publishing companies based in New York City
Publishing companies established in 2001

2001 establishments in New York City